Thomas Pelham, 2nd Earl of Chichester PC, PC (Ire), FRS (28 April 1756 – 4 July 1826), styled The Honourable Thomas Pelham from 1768 until 1783, The Right Honourable Thomas Pelham from 1783 to 1801, and then known as Lord Pelham until 1805, was a British Whig politician. He notably held office as Home Secretary under Henry Addington from 1801 to 1803.

Background and education
Chichester was the eldest son of Thomas Pelham, 1st Earl of Chichester, and his wife Anne, daughter of Frederick Meinhardt Frankland. The Right Reverend George Pelham was his younger brother. He was educated at Westminster and Clare College, Cambridge.

Political career
Pelham was commissioned as a captain in the Sussex Militia when it was raised by the Duke of Richmond in June 1778, and was subsequently promoted to major and lieutenant-colonel, frequently deputising in command for Richmond. During the summer of 1780 the regiment was at Ranmore Camp near Dorking in Surrey, close enough to Sussex for Pelham to stand as a candidate for the county in the general election and to be elected.
 

Chichester was appointed Surveyor-General of the Ordnance under the Duke of Richmond as Master-General of the Ordnance in Lord Rockingham's second ministry (1782), and Chief Secretary for Ireland in the coalition ministry of 1783 (when he was also appointed to the Privy Council of Ireland). He represented Carrick in the Irish House of Commons from 1783 to 1790 and Clogher from 1795 to 1797. In 1795 he was sworn of the Privy Council and became Irish chief secretary under Pitt's government, retiring in 1798.

In the latter year he sat briefly for Naas before transferring to Armagh Borough, a seat he held only until the next year. He was Home Secretary from July 1801 to August 1803 under Addington, who made him Chancellor of the Duchy of Lancaster in 1803. Pelham went out of office in 1804, and in the next year succeeded to the earldom. He was joint-Postmaster General from 1807 to 1823, and for the remaining three years of his life Postmaster General.

Family

Lord Chichester married Lady Mary Henrietta Juliana, daughter of Francis Osborne, 5th Duke of Leeds, in 1801. They had four sons and six daughters. Their second son, the Hon. Frederick Thomas Pelham, was a naval commander, while their third son, the Right Reverend John Thomas Pelham, was Bishop of Norwich. Lord Chichester died in July 1826, aged 70, and was succeeded in his titles by his eldest son, Henry. His daughter Lady Amelia Rose married Major General Sir Joshua Jebb, the Surveyor General of Prisons and designer of Pentonville Prison, the 'Model Prison', on 5 September 1854.  The Countess of Chichester died in October 1862, aged 86.
His daughter, Lady Lucy Anne Pelham, married Sir David Dundas.

References

External links

1756 births
1826 deaths
People educated at Westminster School, London
Alumni of Clare College, Cambridge
Irish MPs 1783–1790
Irish MPs 1790–1797
Irish MPs 1798–1800
Pelham of Stanmer, Thomas Pelham, Lord
British MPs 1780–1784
British MPs 1784–1790
British MPs 1790–1796
British MPs 1796–1800
Pelham of Stanmer, Thomas Pelham, Lord
Pelham of Stanmer, Thomas Pelham, Lord 
UK MPs who inherited peerages
Sussex Militia officers
Members of the Privy Council of Great Britain
Members of the Privy Council of Ireland
British Secretaries of State
Chancellors of the Duchy of Lancaster
Earls of Chichester
United Kingdom Postmasters General
Thomas
Commissioners of the Treasury for Ireland
Chief Secretaries for Ireland
Pelham, Thomas
Members of the Parliament of Ireland (pre-1801) for County Leitrim constituencies
Members of the Parliament of Ireland (pre-1801) for County Tyrone constituencies
Members of the Parliament of Ireland (pre-1801) for County Armagh constituencies
Leaders of the House of Lords